Maria Ribeiro (born 1975) is a Brazilian actress.

Maria Ribeiro may also refer to:
 Maria do Valle Ribeiro (born 1957), United Nations diplomat born in Portugal
 Maria Eugénia Martins de Nazaré Ribeiro, Portuguese judge
 Maria Angélica Ribeiro, Brazilian playwright